Gya or GYA may refer to:
 Gya, symbol for gigayears ago, a unit of time equal to one billion (short-scale, i.e. 1,000,000,000) years before present.
 Gya, symbol for the gray, a unit of radiation exposure, equal to 100 roentgen
 Gya, Ladakh, a village in India
 Global Young Academy, an association of early-career scientists
 Guayaramerín Airport, an airport in Bolivia
 Gulf Yachting Association, a boating organization on the United States coast along the Gulf of Mexico